Universidad del Caribe is a public university in the city of Cancun, Mexico, created in 2000.

References 
Decreto por el que se crea la Universidad del Caribe. (December 2000)

Universities and colleges in Mexico